Wurtsmith Air Force Base is a decommissioned United States Air Force base in Iosco County, Michigan. It operated from 1923 until decommissioned in 1993. On January 18, 1994 it was listed as a Superfund due to extensive groundwater contamination with heavy metals, polycyclic aromatic hydrocarbons, volatile organic compounds, including trichloroethylene, 1,1-dichloroethane, 1,1,1-trichloroethane, and vinyl chloride. In 2010, Per- and polyfluoroalkyl substances contamination was discovered, and as of 2022 remediation is still ongoing.

During the Cold War, it was one of three Strategic Air Command (SAC) bases in Michigan with the B-52 bomber, the others (Kincheloe AFB and Sawyer AFB) were in the Upper Peninsula. The base was named in honor of Major General Paul Wurtsmith, commander of SAC's Eighth Air Force, who was killed when his B-25 Mitchell bomber crashed on Cold Mountain near Asheville, North Carolina, on September 13, 1946.

In 2022, Granot Loma was being touted as a potential space port in the Upper Peninsula.  This would be in tandem with Oscoda, Michigan's Wurtsmith Air Force Base.

Previous names
 Camp Skeel, November 1931
 Oscoda Army Air Field, August 1942
 Oscoda Air Force Base, 24 June 1948
 Wurtsmith Air Force Base, 15 February 1953 – 30 June 1993

Major commands to which assigned
 General Headquarters Air Force, 26 June 1936
 Third Air Force, 2 September 1942
 Air Service Command, 12 December 1942
 Third Air Force, 5 March 1943
 First Air Force, 14 August 1943
 Continental Air Forces, 16 April 1945
 Re-designated Strategic Air Command, 21 March 1946
 Continental Air Command,1 January 1949
 Air Defense Command, 1 January 1951
 Strategic Air Command, 1 April 1960
 Air Combat Command, 1 June 1992 – 30 June 1993

Major units assigned
 First Pursuit Group, 15 October 1927
 100th Base HQ and Air Base Squadron, 31 October 1942
 524th Base HQ and Air Base Squadron, 21 June 1943
 134th AAF Base Unit, 14 April 1944 – 12 April 1945
 4301st Base Services Squadron, 1 August 1948
 Re-designated 2476th Base Service Squadron, 1 January 1949
 Re-designated 4655th Base Service Squadron, 1 December 1950
 332d Fighter Group, 2 April 1943 – 9 July 1943
 100th Fighter Squadron, 29 October 1943 – 8 November 1943
 301st Fighter Squadron, 21 May 1943 – 10 July 1943
 302d Fighter Squadron, 19 November 1943 – December 1943
 403d Fighter Squadron, May 1943 – 15 December 1943
 754th Aircraft Control and Warning Squadron, 27 November 1950 – 20 July 1951
 63d Fighter-Interceptor Squadron, 5 January 1951 – 17 August 1955
 527th Air Service Group
 Re-designated 527th Air Defense Group, 16 February 1953 – 15 October 1955

 75th Fighter-Interceptor Squadron, 1 October 1968 - 30 November 1969
445th Fighter-Interceptor Squadron, 15 August 1955 – 30 September 1968
31st Fighter-Interceptor Squadron, 8 June 1956 – 20 August 1957
18th Fighter-Interceptor Squadron, 20 August 1957 – 27 April 1960
4026th Strategic Wing, 1 August 1958 – 9 January 1961
40th Air Division, 1 July 1959 – 8 June 1988
920th Air Refueling Squadron, 15 July 1960 – 15 June 1993
379th Bombardment Wing, 9 January 1961 – 30 June 1993
94th Fighter-Interceptor Squadron, 1 December 1969 - 30 June 1971

Environmental contamination
On January 18, 1994 Wurtsmith was listed as a Superfund due to extensive groundwater contamination with heavy metals, polycyclic aromatic hydrocarbons, volatile organic compounds, including trichloroethylene, 1,1-dichloroethane, 1,1,1-trichloroethane, and vinyl chloride.

In March 2010 the Michigan Department of Environment, Great Lakes, and Energy (EGLE) became aware of Per- and polyfluoroalkyl substances concentrations in groundwater, when EGLE staff sampled at a former fire training area on the base. Air Force completed the PFAS Preliminary Assessment, Site Inspection, and planned the Remedial Investigation under the Comprehensive Environmental Response, Compensation, and Liability Act. Air Force performed three removal actions and  planned two interim remedial actions. On November 1, 2017, more than twenty-two years after being listed as a superfundsite  Wurtsmith held its first Restoration Advisory Board meeting.

During the COVID-19 pandemic, Wurtsmith Restoration Advisory Board (RAB) meetings became virtual events, yet in August 2021 RAB members said that progress was made on the WAFB cleanup, and that the relationship between the Air Force and the community has improved.

See also

 Michigan World War II Army Airfields
 Central Air Defense Force (Air Defense Command)

References

Further reading
 Maurer, Maurer. Air Force Combat Units of World War II. Washington, DC: U.S. Government Printing Office 1961 (republished 1983, Office of Air Force History).
 Ravenstein, Charles A. Air Force Combat Wings Lineage and Honors Histories 1947–1977. Maxwell Air Force Base, Alabama: Office of Air Force History 1984. .
 Mueller, Robert (1989). Volume 1: Active Air Force Bases Within the United States of America on 17 September 1982.
 USAF Aerospace Defense Command publication, The Interceptor, January 1979 (Volume 21, Number 1).

External links

Wurtsmith Air Force Base, Superfund Site, EPA.gov 
Air Force BRAC Recommendations
Oscoda-Wurtsmith Airport
Renaissance Zones
Oscoda-Wurtsmith Airport airport information
Wurtsmith Air Museum

Installations of the United States Air Force in Michigan
1923 establishments in Michigan
Buildings and structures in Iosco County, Michigan
Military installations closed in 1993
Installations of Strategic Air Command
Military Superfund sites
Superfund sites in Michigan
1993 disestablishments in Michigan